The 1894 Army Cadets football team represented the United States Military Academy in the 1894 college football season. In their first season under head coach Harmon S. Graves, the Cadets compiled a 3–2 record and outscored their opponents by a combined total of 95 to 22.  The Army–Navy Game was not played in 1894.

No Army Cadets were honored on the 1894 College Football All-America Team.

Schedule

References

Army
Army Black Knights football seasons
Army Cadets football